Gavin B. Baxter (born October 16, 1997) is an American former basketball player. He played college basketball for the BYU Cougars and the Utah Utes. Listed at 6 ft 9 in (2.06 m) and 225 pounds (103 kg), he plays the small forward position.

High school career
Baxter attended Timpview High School, where he was rated a four-star recruit and was ranked among the top 5 recruits in Utah. He led his team to two Utah 4A State Quarterfinals, and finished runner-up his senior year. He also managed to receive honors as first second and third team all-State in his sophomore, junior, and senior year. He was recruited by Arizona State, California, Oregon, Oregon State, UCLA, and Utah State. He also played for the Utah Prospects, an AAU club basketball team coached by Tim Davis, featuring talent such as Connor Harding, Yoeli Childs, and Frank Jackson.

College career
In his freshman year at BYU, he was selected to the West Coast Conference All-Freshman Team. Baxter averaged 4.7 points and 3.1 rebounds per game. He was sidelined with a shoulder injury for most of his sophomore season, playing seven games. Baxter tore his ACL in a game against New Orleans during his junior season, causing him to be out for the season. He averaged 6.5 points and 4 rebounds per game in two games before being sidelined. On December 1, 2021, Baxter tore his ACL in a game versus in-state foe Utah Valley, marking two straight seasons in which Baxter has suffered a season-ending injury, on top of his shoulder injury during his sophomore season which limited him to 7 games played. Baxter averaged 6.6 points, 0.4 assists, and 2.6 rebounds per game before the injury. After the season, he transferred to Utah as a walk-on. On December 8, 2022, Baxter announced his medical retirement in basketball after dealing with multiple injuries throughout his career.

Career statistics

College

|-
| style="text-align:left;"| 2018–19
| style="text-align:left;"| BYU
| 30 || 8 || 14.7 || .648 || .333 || .513 || 3.1 || .2 || .2 || 1.1 || 4.7
|-
| style="text-align:left;"| 2019–20
| style="text-align:left;"| BYU
| 7 || 1 || 9.0 || .500 || – || .500 || 1.6 || .4 || .0 || .6 || 1.3
|-
| style="text-align:left;"| 2020–21
| style="text-align:left;"| BYU
| 2 || 2 || 14.0 || .857 || .000 || .250 || 4.0 || 1.0 || .0 || .5 || 6.5
|-
| style="text-align:left;"| 2021–22
| style="text-align:left;"| BYU
| 8 || 7 || 12.0 || .649 || .000 || .500 || 2.6 || .4 || .3 || 1.1 || 6.6
|-
| style="text-align:left;"| 2022–23
| style="text-align:left;"| Utah
| 7 || 0 || 7.9 || .375 || – || .667 || 1.6 || .1 || .0 || .9 || 1.4
|- class="sortbottom"
| style="text-align:center;" colspan="2"| Career
| 54 || 18 || 12.6 || .636 || .222 || .508 || 2.6 || .3 || .1 || 1.0 || 4.2

Personal life
Gavin's parents were both athletes as well. His father Kurt played basketball for BYU and Snow College. His mother Angela ran track for BYU, earning recognition as an All-American in the 1986 season in Indoor Track. She also held the BYU women's 200m record for 26 years, with a time of 23.39, and competed internationally for her home country of Scotland. His sister Lauren also ran track for BYU.

References

External links
Utah Utes bio
BYU Cougars bio

Living people
1997 births
American men's basketball players
Basketball players from Utah
BYU Cougars men's basketball players
Small forwards
Sportspeople from Provo, Utah